Jefferson Tomaz de Souza (born 22 November 1970) is a retired Brazilian football midfielder.

References

1970 births
Living people
Brazilian footballers
U.S.C. Paredes players
F.C. Vizela players
Leça F.C. players
Varzim S.C. players
S.C. Freamunde players
F.C. Lixa players
GD Beira-Mar players
Rebordosa A.C. players
Association football midfielders
Primeira Liga players
Brazilian expatriate footballers
Expatriate footballers in Portugal
Brazilian expatriate sportspeople in Portugal